The 2019 Hungarian Open was a men's tennis tournament to be played on outdoor clay courts. It was the 3rd edition of the event, and part of the ATP Tour 250 series of the 2019 ATP Tour. It took place at Sport 11 in Budapest, Hungary, from April 22–28.

Singles main-draw entrants

Seeds

1 Rankings are as of April 15, 2019

Other entrants
The following players received wildcards into the singles main draw:
  Attila Balázs 
  Marin Čilić 
  Máté Valkusz

The following players received entry from the qualifying draw:
  Lloyd Harris 
  Miomir Kecmanović 
  Filip Krajinović
  Yannick Maden

The following players received entry as lucky losers:
  Matthias Bachinger
  Egor Gerasimov
  Jannik Sinner
  Sergiy Stakhovsky

Withdrawals
  Marco Cecchinato → replaced by  Matthias Bachinger
  Damir Džumhur → replaced by  Egor Gerasimov
  Dušan Lajović → replaced by  Jannik Sinner
  Adrian Mannarino → replaced by  Sergiy Stakhovsky

Doubles main-draw entrants

Seeds

1 Rankings are as of April 15, 2019

Other entrants
The following pairs received wildcards into the doubles main draw:
  Gábor Borsos /  Péter Nagy
  Máté Valkusz /  Nenad Zimonjić

The following pairs received entry as alternates:
  Andre Begemann /  Ernests Gulbis
  Thomas Fabbiano /  John Millman

Withdrawals
  Marco Cecchinato
  Dušan Lajović

Champions

Singles 

  Matteo Berrettini def.  Filip Krajinović, 4–6, 6–3, 6–1

Doubles 

  Ken Skupski /  Neal Skupski def.  Marcus Daniell /  Wesley Koolhof, 6–3, 6–4

References

External links 
Official website

2019
2019 ATP Tour
2019 in Hungarian tennis
April 2019 sports events in Europe